Station for Two  is a 1983 Soviet romantic comedy directed by Eldar Ryazanov. The film became the Soviet box office leader of 1983 with a total of 35.8 million ticket sales. It was entered into the 1983 Cannes Film Festival.

Plot summary
There are three main heroes in this movie: Vera, a waitress; Platon, a pianist; and ... a train station where these two people met. The differences in the heroes' characters and professions, the plight that Platon found himself in (he is to be arrested and undergo trial) trigger a host of both amusing and sad situations which serve as a backdrop for their unfolding love. Platon is innocent of the crime he is accused of. He simply took the blame for his wife's driving over a pedestrian. But this is known only to Platon's wife and Vera in whom he confided. However, after the verdict has been passed, Platon's life is of no interest to his wife, although Vera is ready to wait for his release.

Ideas for the filming 
The script (the beginning and the end of the movie) is based on two real stories from the life of well-known people – the composer Mikael Tariverdiev and the poet Yaroslav Smelyakov.

The idea was given to the authors by Tariverdiyev. During the trip on his car, he took the passenger's seat and had one of the famous actresses drive his car. Unfortunately, it ended tragically. They had an accident and a pedestrian died. The composer decided to take the blame on himself to save the woman. There was a very long legal process that lasted about two years. Mikael was found guilty. But he was saved by amnesty. However, the affair with that woman did not last long.

The second story, which happened with the poet Smelyakov, was used in the ending of the film. He was arrested in the early 1950s and was sent to the Arctic Circle. In 1953, he was given a day off to meet his friends. The next morning after the feast friends woke up late and overslept the roll-call. Delay for the roll-call was equated with the escape. So, Smelyakov and his friends had to run a few kilometers along the snow-covered tundra to the camp. Towards the end of the road, his friends had to drag him up to the very gates of the camp, as he was too tired.

Cast
 Lyudmila Gurchenko as Vera Nikolayevna Nefyodova, waitress 
 Oleg Basilashvili as Platon Sergeyevich Ryabinin, pianist
 Nikita Mikhalkov as Andrey, conductor
 Nonna Mordyukova as "Uncle Misha", a speculator
 Mikhail Kononov as  Nikolasha, militiaman
 Anastasia Voznesenskaya as Yuliya, on duty at the hotel
 Aleksandr Shirvindt as Shurik,  pianist
 Tatyana Dogileva as Marina, on duty at the hotel
 Olga Volkova as Violetta, waitress
 Raisa Etush as Lyuda, waitress 
 Viktor Bortsov as drunken visitor restaurant
 Anatoli Skoryakin as commandant
 Stanislav Sadalsky as drunk man with a carburetor
 Alla Budnitskaya as Masha, Platon's wife 
 Eldar Ryazanov as Railroad Supervisor

References

External links

Trailer and Screenshots

1983 films
Mosfilm films
1983 romantic comedy films
1980s Russian-language films
1983 in the Soviet Union
Films directed by Eldar Ryazanov
Films set in Russia
Films set in the Soviet Union
Films shot in Moscow
Films shot in Moscow Oblast
Films shot in Saint Petersburg
Films scored by Andrey Petrov
1980s prison films
Soviet romantic comedy films
Russian historical comedy films
Prison comedy films